Bankston is a surname and an Anglicized variant spelling of the Swedish patronym Bengtsson. It originates from Anders Bengtsson (1640-1705), who emigrated to Colonial America in 1656 to live in the Swedish colony of New Sweden. When the British claimed New Sweden, Swedish and Finnish immigrants who stayed became naturalized British citizens, and Anders adopted the Bengtsson patronym as his surname under English custom and law. The surname appears in British records with over a dozen spelling variants, but Bankson/Bankston emerged as the dominant spelling. Anders Bengtsson was elected to serve in the inaugural Pennsylvania Assembly in 1683 and witnessed adoption of William Penn's Frame of Government. The Bankson/Bankston descendants of Anders Bengtsson constitute one of the oldest Swedish-American families in history. 

Notable people with the surname include:

Bankston
Bill Bankston (1893–1970), American baseball player
Carl L. Bankston (born 1952), American sociologist and writer
Christine Fulwylie-Bankston (1916-1998), American educator and civil rights activist
Kevin Bankston (born 1974), American attorney and activist
King Louie Bankston (1973-2022), American musician
Larry S. Bankston (born 1951), American lawyer and politician
Michael Bankston (born 1970), American football player
Warren Bankston (born 1947), American football player
Wes Bankston (born 1983), American baseball player

Bankson
Cassandra Bankson (born 1992), American media personality and model